The Greek men's national under-17 basketball team (Greek: Εθνική ομάδα καλαθοσφαίρισης Παίδων Ελλάδας) is the Under-17 age representative for Greece in international youth basketball competitions. It is organized and run by the Hellenic Basketball Federation (Ε.Ο.Κ.). The Greek Under-17 national basketball team represents Greece at the FIBA Under-17 Basketball World Cup.

FIBA Under-17 Basketball World Cup

Under
Men's national under-17 basketball teams

External links
Official Website